Physocarpus opulifolius,  known as common ninebark, Eastern ninebark, Atlantic ninebark, or simply ninebark, is a species of flowering plant in the rose family Rosaceae, native to eastern North America.

Description
It is a mound-shaped deciduous shrub with alternate, simple leaves, on arching stems. It is fast-growing, insect- and disease-resistant, and drought-tolerant. The species is adaptable to a very wide range of soil and site conditions, from moist to dry, acid to alkaline, and gravelly to heavy clay; and can grow in partial shade to full sun. The 5-petaled,  diameter flowers form in corymbs. The flowers are white to pinkish, blooming from May to June in North America. In Missouri the fruits ripen from August to early October and are small, dry pods hanging in drooping, papery clusters. The bark peels off in thin papery strips, resembling the number nine in shape, exposing brown inner bark which is the origin of the common name.

Distribution and habitat
Physocarpus opulifolius is found in eastern North America on rocky hillsides and banks of streams as well as in moist thickets, especially in counties south of the Missouri River. There is also a scarcely distinguishable form in the Rocky Mountain region and the Pacific Northwest. Its native range is from New York to Minnesota and South Dakota, south to Florida, Arkansas and Kansas. But it can be found from Quebec west to Minnesota, South Dakota and Colorado, south to Oklahoma to Georgia and north to New York. The shrub is an escape, or a wild plant formerly cultivated, northeastward.

Uses
The ability of P. opulifolius to grow in harsh conditions makes it especially suitable for erosion control on banks. But it is also grown for its ornamental foliage. Numerous cultivars have been developed, of which 'Dart's Gold', 'Diabolo', and  = ‘Tuilad’ have gained the Royal Horticultural Society's Award of Garden Merit.  Newer cultivars offer different foliage color as well as smaller overall plant size.

Ecology
It is a larval host for the dimorphic eulithis, for Macaria abruptata, the white spring moth, Ancylis spiraeifoliana, the blinded sphinx moth, and possibly the bluish spring moth. The larvae of the raspberry leafroller have also been recorded on this plant.

Notes

References

 Source of the distinguish remark in the header.

External links

 
 USDA Plants Profile for Physocarpus opulifolius
 

opulifolius
Flora of Eastern Canada
Flora of the Northeastern United States
Flora of the North-Central United States
Flora of the Southeastern United States
Flora of the Great Lakes region (North America)
Shrubs
Taxa named by Carl Linnaeus
Flora without expected TNC conservation status